Fury Road is a professional wrestling supercard event produced by Major League Wrestling (MLW). The first two events held under the chronology were television tapings for the promotion's weekly program, MLW Fusion, with the second event broadcast as a special live episode on June 1, 2019.

Dates and venues

2018

Fury Road (2018) took place on October 4, 2018 at the Melrose Ballroom in Queens, New York City, New York. It was a set of television tapings for future episodes of Fusion. It was the first event in the Fury Road chronology. Thirteen matches were contested at the event including a highly anticipated main event match between PCO and LA Park, which Park won. Other prominent matches on the undercard included a three-way elimination match for the World Middleweight Championship, Low Ki versus Daga for the World Heavyweight Championship and Jimmy Havoc versus Sami Callihan in a Spin the Wheel, Make the Deal match.
Results

2022

Fury Road (2022) took place on August 27, 2022 at Cathedral High School in El Paso, Texas. It was originally supposed to be a set of television tapings for future episodes of Fusion, but those plans were cancelled, and the event became a house show. It was the third event in the Fury Road chronology.

References

Fury Road
2018 in professional wrestling
October 2018 events in the United States